Inuit Qaujimajatuqangit (/inuit qaujimajatuqaŋit/, Inuktitut syllabics: ᐃᓄᐃᑦ ᖃᐅᔨᒪᔭᑐᖃᖏᑦ; sometimes Inuit Qaujimanituqangit - ᐃᓄᐃᑦ ᖃᐅᔨᒪᓂᑐᖃᖏᑦ) is an Inuktitut phrase that is often translated as "Inuit traditional knowledge", "Inuit traditional institutions" or even "Inuit traditional technology". It is often abbreviated as "IQ". It comes from the verb root "qaujima-" meaning "to know" and could be literally translated as "that which has long been known by Inuit".

Traditional knowledge
Inuit Qaujimajatuqangit is a body of knowledge and unique cultural insights of Inuit into the workings of nature, humans and animals. Inuit Qaujimajatuqangit, then, has both practical and epistemological aspects that branch out from a fundamental principle that human beings are learning, rational beings with an infinite potential for problem-solving within the dictates of nature and technology. According to the Government of Nunavut 2013 document entitled Incorporating Inuit Societal Values, Inuit Qaujimajatuqangit has the following components:
 Inuuqatigiitsiarniq (respecting others, relationships and caring for people)
 Tunnganarniq (fostering good spirit by being open, welcoming and inclusive)
 Pijitsirniq (serving and providing for family or community, or both)
 Aajiiqatigiinniq (decision making through discussion and consensus)
 Pilimmaksarniq or Pijariuqsarniq (development of skills through practice, effort and action)
 Piliriqatigiinniq or Ikajuqtigiinniq (working together for a common cause)
 Qanuqtuurniq (being innovative and resourceful)
 Avatittinnik Kamatsiarniq (respect and care for the land, animals and the environment)

The Inuit Language Protection Act of 2008 establishes the rights of parents to receive instruction in Inuktitut.

Similarly, Inuit intergenerational (from elder to youth) and experiential (learning through participation) knowledge has also been called "Inuit ecological knowledge" or "IEK"

Studies of traditional knowledge
The Igloolik Research Centre in Igloolik, Nunavut focuses on documenting Inuit Qaujimajatuqangit, as well as climatology and seismic data research.

Politics
During the early 21st century it has become something of a political slogan in Nunavut, as the government attempts to integrate the traditional culture of the Inuit more into their modern governance structure in order to combat disempowerment. Its critics , however, tend to view it as little more than window dressing for more conventional politics.

In academia 
Qaujimajatuqangit has been incorporated into Canadian academic settings in the 21st century. Marine biologist Enooyaq Sudlovenick uses qaujimajatuqangit to study the health of marine arctic animals including beluga and ringed seals.

See also
 Traditional ecological knowledge

References

Footnotes

Citations
 Eyegetok, Sandra, and Natasha Thorpe. The Hiukitak River Elder-Youth Camp, August 7-14, 1998. Nunavut?: s.n, 1998.

Further reading

 Kassam, K.-A. S. 2002. "Thunder on the Tundra: Inuit Qaujimajatuqangit of the Bathurst Caribou, by Natasha Thorpe, Naikak Hakongak, Sandra Eyegetok, and the Kitikmeot Elders". Arctic. 55: 395.
 Oosten, Jarich, Frédéric Laugrand, and Mariano Aupilaarjuk. Inuit qaujimajatuqangit shamanism and reintegrating wrongdoers into the community. Inuit perspectives on the 20th century, v. 4. Iqaluit: Nunavut Arctic College, Language and Culture Program, 2002. 
 Wenzel, George W. 2004. "From TEK to IQ: Inuit Qaujimajatuqangit and Inuit Cultural Ecology". Arctic Anthropology. 41, no. 2: 238.

External links
 Education Framework
 What is Inuit Qaujimajatuqangit?- Canku Ota, An Online Newsletter Celebrating Native America, January 13, 2001 - Issue 27.
 Inuit Qaujimajatuqangit (IQ)- Department of Human Resources, Government of Nunavut, 2005
 Inuit Qaujimajatuqangita Isumaksaqsiurtingit (IQI) Committee- Nunavut Department of Economic Development & Transportation, 2006
 Inuit Qaujimajatuqangit Katimajiit Established- Nunavut Department of Culture, Language, Edlers and Youth, September 8, 2003
 Qaujimajatuqangit and social problems in modern Inuit society. An elders workshop on angakkuuniq- by Jarich Oosten and Frédéric Laugrand, 2002

Inuit culture
Culture of Nunavut
Inuktitut words and phrases
Canadian political phrases
Traditional knowledge